Diederik (or Dirk) Johannes Opperman, commonly referred to as D.J. Opperman ( 29 September 1914 – 22 September 1985) was an Afrikaans poet.

Biography
He was born on 29 September 1914 in Dundee in Natal, where he grew up. He went to school in the towns of Estcourt and Vryheid, and afterwards received an M.A. degree from the University of Natal. He taught at schools in Pietermaritzburg and Johannesburg, and later on became editor of Die Huisgenoot. In 1949 he became a lecturer at the University of Cape Town. During this period he completed one of his most important publications – Digters van Dertig (Poets of the thirties) – in 1953.

He won the prestigious Hertzog prize for poetry in 1947 for his collection Heilige beeste ("Holy cattle"). From 1960 to 1975 he was a professor of Afrikaans at Stellenbosch University, where he also served on the editorial board of the publication Standpunte ("Points of View"). He died in 1985 in Stellenbosch.

He won four Hertzog prizes (in 1947, 1956, 1969 and 1980), four Hofmeyer prizes (in 1954, 1956, 1966 and 1980), two CNA Prizes (in 1964 and 1980), a prize from the "Drie-Eeue Stigting" ("Three Centuries Foundation") in 1956, the Louis Luyt-prize in 1980 and the Gustav Preller prize for literary criticism in 1985.

The South African composers Cromwell Everson and Prof Piet de Villiers wrote music for some of Opperman's poems, such as Kontraste and Nagstorm oor die see.

List of works

Poetry
Heilige Beeste ("Holy cows" 1945)
Negester oor Ninevé ("Nine star over Niniveh"
Joernaal van Jorik ("The Journal of Jorik" 1949)
Engel uit die klip ("Angel from the Stone" 1948)
Blom en baaierd ("Flower and Chaos" or "Flower and Rubble" 1948)
Dolosse ("Large T-shaped concrete bollards used to curb waves breaking close to infrastructure" )
Kuns-mis ("Fertilizer")
Edms. Bpk ("Pty. Ltd") 
Komas uit 'n bamboesstok ("Comas from a Bamboo Pole" 1979)

Verse plays
Periandros van Korinthe ("Periandros of Corinth" 1954)
Vergelegen (A place name, lit. "faraway" 1956) 
Voëlvry ("Outlaw"; lit. "bird-free" 1987)

Essays on literature
Wiggelstok ("Divining rod")
Naaldekoker  Daggaroker ("Dragonfly")
Verspreide opstelle ("Spread-out essays" – the direct opposite of "Collected essays" in Afrikaans)

References

1914 births
1985 deaths
People from Umzinyathi District Municipality
Afrikaans-language poets
Afrikaner people
South African male poets
Afrikaans-language writers
Calvinist and Reformed poets
University of Natal alumni
Academic staff of the University of Cape Town
Hertzog Prize winners for poetry
Academic staff of Stellenbosch University
20th-century South African poets
20th-century South African male writers